Vargas Plateau Regional Park sits on a plateau in the Fremont Hills of Alameda County, California that overlooks the San Francisco Bay, Niles Canyon, and the cities of Fremont, Union City and Newark.

History
Vargas Plateau once was part of the homeland of two Ohlone-speaking tribes, the Tuibun and Causen, who used the area for hunting and farming. After the Spanish took control of California, the two tribes began living and working at Mission San Jose in 1797. After the mission was secularized, the land was granted to Juan Bautista Alvarado and Andres Pico in 1846.  The native people essentially became serfs under this arrangement, losing any claim to the Vargas Plateau.

After California became an American state in 1850, many of the old land grants were declared void by American courts. Such was the case with the Alvarado and Pico properties, and the land eventually became part of a horse breeding ranch, which was subdivided about 1900. In 1909, Antonio Francisco Vargas bought  of the "lower ranch" and by 1912, Antonio's brother Manuel and nephew Edward bought  of the "upper ranch". Manuel and Edward used their land for sheep and cattle ranching, as well as for dryland farming. The Tavares family inherited the upper ranch after Edward Vargas died in 1978. Antonio's direct descendants continued raising cattle on the lower ranch until the land was sold to the East Bay Regional Park District (EBRPD) in 1993. EBRPD bought the Tavares' property in 1996.

Subsequently, park use was pushed back. As of 2007, the opening was expected by 2010. In 2010, EBRPD directors were expecting it would open soon. In 2011, EBRPD put the start in 2012. As of January 2015, EBRPD pointed to late 2015; while as of May 2015, the district pointed to spring 2016.

A 2012 settlement agreement between EBRPD and the owners of two large nearby ranches required the construction of improvements to park access roads. EBRPD and the city of Fremont agreed in 2013 to undertake them jointly, using $260,000 of funding by EBRPD and performed by the city. The park opened on May 5, 2016.

However, the park was closed by a court-issued preliminary injunction on July 13, 2016. The court found that the park district “did not complete the improvements required by the settlement agreement prior to opening,” which had “very specific road widening requirements.” The order applied to access by motor vehicles, as well as to access by non-motorized users for hiking, bicycling and horse riding, with immediate effect. “The park could remain closed for months or years,” until the improvements are completed.

On May 2, 2017, EBRPD announced that it had settled the lawsuit, and that the park would reopen on May 15, 2017. EBRPD said that it agreed to construct a paved shoulder along Vargas Road, and a vehicle turnaround on the upper part of Morrison Canyon Road. It also announced that the City of Fremont had agreed to contribute part of the necessary funds.

Wildlife
The park contains an array of habitats, such as grassland, seasonal wetlands, stock ponds, perennial and ephemeral drainages, northern coastal scrublands and oak woodlands, with some low rock outcrops. The steep slopes of the plateau has protected the native wildlife species and from exposure to human development. The result is that several species that are considered threatened or endangered elsewhere in the state may be found here. These include the threatened California red-legged frog, the Alameda whipsnake, and the federally threatened California tiger salamander. Other reptiles include the Pacific gopher snake and the Northern Pacific rattlesnake. Bird species living here include red-tailed hawks, [[Cooper's hawk
]], great-horned owls, pygmy owls, and wild turkeys.

Activities
Hiking, biking and horseback riding are the most popular activities. Observation of birds and other wildlife can also be enjoyed from the trails.

Facilities
The park is relatively new and few facilities or conveniences are available. About  of hiking/biking/equestrian trails have been built. However, the topography is rugged, making the trails generally unsuitable for most wheel chairs. There is a trailhead with a  restroom and a wayside panel, but no drinking water. Potential visitors should be aware that car parking is very limited at the trailhead inside the park, and no street parking is allowed. There are no campsites or picnic grounds.

Notes

References 

East Bay Regional Park District
Parks in Alameda County, California
Bay Area Ridge Trail